Western Yesterdays is a 1924 American silent Western film directed by Francis Ford and starring Edmund Cobb, Florence Gilbert and Ashton Dearholt.

Cast
 Edmund Cobb as Deputy Jim Blake
 Florence Gilbert as Rose Silver
 William White as Sheriff Bill Hickson
 Ashton Dearholt as Pinto Pete
 Helen Broneau as Juanita
 Joe De La Cruz as Rude Reverence
 Francis Ford as Twitchie
 Clark B. Coffey as Clarence 
 Mark Hamilton as Blackstone

References

Bibliography
 Munden, Kenneth White. The American Film Institute Catalog of Motion Pictures Produced in the United States, Part 1. University of California Press, 1997.

External links
 

1924 films
1924 Western (genre) films
Films directed by Francis Ford
Arrow Film Corporation films
Silent American Western (genre) films
1920s English-language films
1920s American films